Fritz Schultze (pron shụl'tse) (1846–1908) was a German philosopher.

Schultze was born at Celle and educated at Jena, Göttingen, and Munich. He was professor extraordinary of philosophy at Jena in 1875 and 1876, when he was appointed professor of philosophy and pedagogy at the Royal Polytechnic Institute of Dresden.

Publications
 (1871)
 (1st vol. 1874)
 (1881–82)
 (1890)
 (1894)

References

External links
 Photograph album of German and Austrian scientists (1877), Darwin Correspondence Project

1846 births
1908 deaths
19th-century German philosophers